The Ughs! is an instrumental album by The Residents that was released on November 3, 2009.
The songs on the album consists of segments from The Voice of Midnight but structured in a new way that does not need a narrative over it.

During the process of making their 2007 album, The Voice of Midnight, the band decided to create an alter ego called The Ughs! so that they could allow themselves to act out in new roles.

Track listing

References

The Residents albums
2009 albums